Amadas is a medieval English chivalric romance.

Amadas may also refer to:

People
Elizabeth Amadas (died 1532), a lady at the royal court of King Henry VIII of England
John Amadas (by 1489 – 1554/55), an English politician
Philip Amadas (1565–?), a naval commander and explorer in Elizabethan England
Robert Amadas  (before 1490 – 1532), a London Goldsmith

Other uses
Amadas Coach, an American designer and builder of luxury motorhomes